The 1000 meters distance for men in the 2015–16 ISU Speed Skating World Cup was a competition held over 7 races on six occasions, with the first occasion taking place in Calgary, Alberta, Canada, on 13–15 November 2015, and the final occasion taking place in Heerenveen, Netherlands, on 11–13 March 2016.

The defending champion was Pavel Kulizhnikov of Russia.

Top three

Race medallists

Standings

References 

 
Men 1000